The 1959 All-Ireland Senior Camogie Championship was the high point of the 1959 camogie season. The championship was won by Dublin who defeated surprise finalists Mayo by a 33-point margin in one of the most one-sided finals in camogie history. The match drew an attendance of 4,000. The championship was the first to have a match televised, when a BBC television crew covered the All-Ireland semi-final between Antrim and Dublin in Belfast.

Semi-finals
Boosted by the presence of the talented Josie Ruane from Keelogues at full-back and later at centre-back, and by the interest of PJ Hennelly, who later became general manager of the Connaught Telegraph, and Gerry Bracken of Newport, editor of The Mayo News, Mayo surprised Galway in Mulranny on May 31 in the Connacht semi-final and defeated Sligo 7-2 to 0-3 in the most unusual Connacht final in camogie history at Manulla on 5 July, with three goals from Peggy Coughter, two from Eileen Clarke and one each from Josie Ruane and Bridie Kilroy.

Waterford won the Munster championship for the first time with an outstanding full back Josie McNamara, who refereed the All Ireland semi-final between Dublin and Antrim, and was also a noted badminton player. With outstanding performances from Geraldine Power, Lilian Howlett and Pat Doyle, Waterford defeated Clare by 19 points in the first round of the Munster championship, then Limerick, Cork and London in the All Ireland quarter-final. Dublin beat Wexford in the lienster final.

Semi-finals
The unlikely pairing of Mayo and Waterford met in a farcical semi-final at Newport on an unplayable field. The match, the first inter-county fixture to be drawn since the 1942 final, went into extra time and Waterford were leading by three points when Eileen Clarke pounced for an equalising goal. There was a suggestion that the teams play another period of extra time but the captains refused to continue. Instead the All-Ireland final fixed for 16 August was postponed to enable a replay in Roscrea.

Waterford led 1-5 to 1-1 at half-time in the replay before a great fight-back and a last minute victory for Mayo, who had 2-2 from Eileen Clarke a goal from Peggy Coughter and a point from Josie Ruane. Mayo snatched a last-minute victory, with a long-range point from centre-back, Josie Ruane, by 3-4 to 2-6. In the other semi-final between Dublin and Antrim Una O'Connor scored two goals, the first by pouncing on a bad clearance, and Kathleen Mills got the third with Dublin going on to win by two points.

Final
Dublin went into the lead from the throw-in of the final, when Úna O'Connor raced through for a goal and eventually ran up a remarkable tally of 5-2. By half time Dublin led by 6-2 to 0-1, Mayo rallied briefly after the interval but Dublin continued to dominate exchanges and pile up the scores. It was late in the game before Mayo registered their only score from play, a well-taken goal by Eileen Clarke which was greeted with the greatest cheer of the evening. Agnes Hourigan wrote in the Irish Press:
Dublin’s superiority stemmed from midfield where the hard-working Annette Corrigan, Kay Mills and captain Brid Reid, who had flown back from her honeymoon to play, were always in complete control. These three laid on perfect passes for their clever forwards, who cut through the Mayo defence almost at will. Mayo seldom showed us anything of the fine form that had characterized their earlier victories. Sole exception was their captain, Josie Ruane, who did Trojan work at centre-back all through, and who was deadly accurate from frees, scoring all of her team’s points. Their lack of experience told against them and some of their players seemed over-awed by the setting and the occasion.

Final stages

MATCH RULES
50 minutes
Replay if scores level
Maximum of 3 substitutions

See also
 All-Ireland Senior Hurling Championship
 Wikipedia List of Camogie players
 National Camogie League
 Camogie All Stars Awards
 Ashbourne Cup

References

External links
 Camogie Association
 Reference to Mayo’s 1959 achievement on connachtgaa.ie
 All-Ireland Senior Camogie Championship: Roll of Honour
 Historical reports of All Ireland finals
 Camogie on facebook
 Camogie on GAA Oral History Project

All-Ireland Senior Camogie Championship
1959
All-Ireland Senior Camogie Championship
All-Ireland Senior Camogie Championship